Mueang Rayong is the capital district (amphoe mueang) of Rayong province, Thailand. The provincial administration is in Tambon Map Ta Phut.

Geography
Neighboring districts are (from the west clockwise) Ban Chang, Nikhom Phatthana, Ban Khai, Wang Chan, and Klaeng. To the south is the Gulf of Thailand. 

The popular holiday island of Ko Samet, which is part of the Khao Laem Ya – Mu Ko Samet National Park, is in Mueang Rayong District.

Economy 
The town of Map Ta Phut is in the western part of Mueang Rayong District. It is the site of the Map Ta Phut Industrial Estate, Thailand's largest petrochemical and heavy industry park. It contributes to Rayong Province's economic output, but has also become known for scandals involving hazardous waste, industrial accidents, and pollution.

History
Originally named Mueang, the district was renamed after its central sub-district Tha Pradu (ท่าประดู่) in 1917.  In 1938 it was renamed "Mueang Rayong".

Administration
The district is divided into 15 sub-districts (tambons), which are further subdivided into 86 villages (mubans). Rayong is a city (thesaban nakhon) which covers tambons Tha Pradu and Pak Nam and parts of tambons Choeng Noen and Noen Phra. The town (thesaban mueang) Map Ta Phut covers the whole tambon Map Ta Phut and Huai Pong, parts of Noen Phra and Thap Ma and also parts of tambon Mapkha of neighboring Nikhom Phatthana district. There are a further two sub-district municipalities (thesaban tambon). Klaeng Kachet covers parts of the tambon Klaeng and Kachet, and Ban Phe parts of tambon Phe. The remaining areas of the sub-districts Noen Phra and Thap Ma as well as the whole Nam Khok are also each a sub-district municipality. The other eight sub-districts each have a tambon administrative organization (TAO).

See also
 Eastern Seaboard of Thailand

References

External links
amphoe.com (thai)
 Khao Laem Ya - Mu Ko Samet National Park
 Eastern Economic Corridor (EEC) Office

Mueang Rayong